Berkane Province (Berber: Aberkan, ⴱⴻⵔⴽⴰⵏ, Arabic: بَركان) is located in northeastern Morocco in the area of Aït Iznasen. It is bounded by the Mediterranean to its north, the Kiss Oued (Moroccan-Algerian border) and Oujda Prefecture in the east, Nador Province to the west, and Taourirt Province in the south. The Berkane Province includes under its jurisdiction the towns of Saïdia and Ahfir. The population of the city is 80,012 as of the 2004 census. The population originates primarily from Aït Iznasen, a major tribe which consists of Berber clans. The tribe's descendants are spread widely over the rest of eastern Morocco, usually in cities like Ahfir, Saïdia and Oujda. Due to recent immigration originating from all over Morocco, the eastern dialect of Moroccan Arabic is spoken by most of the citizens, although Berber is still spoken by many of the adults.

Berkane is considered the capital of the citrus fruit industry of Morocco, and high-quality fresh fruit and vegetables are plentiful year round. It is known for its farms of clementines, also a large statue of an orange is at the center of town. It is very close to Saïdia, a popular beach resort town on the Mediterranean, as well as Tafoughalt, a small village in the nearby mountains known for its healthy air and herb markets. Berkane is also famous for being the birthplace of the Olympic athlete Hicham El Guerrouj, who holds the world record for the fastest mile but he has never been a major social player in the development of his native town.

Berkane is a sprawling city centered on Avenue Mohammed V, a commercial and business strip, and boulevard Ibn Sina/Rue Dehb or Alhob (meaning "The Street of Gold and or street of love"). This boulevard is lined with many of the most popular cafés and jewelry shops. The city sprawls into the hillsides and connects via bridge to a small neighboring town named Sidi Slimane, giving the impression that it is much larger than the census claims.

The major cities and towns are: 
 Ahfir
 Ain Erreggada
 Aklim
 Berkane
 Bouhdila
 Madagh
 Saïdia
 Sidi Slimane Echcharraa

Etymology
The province is named after its largest city, Berkane. The name of the city comes from the word "aberkan" which means "black" in the Berber language.

Subdivisions
The province is divided administratively into the following:

References

 
Berkane